SIC (acronym of full name Sociedade Independente de Comunicação) ("Independent Communication Society") is a Portuguese television network and media company, which runs several television channels. Their flagship channel is the eponymous SIC, the third terrestrial television station in Portugal, launched on 6 October 1992. SIC is owned by Impresa, a Portuguese media conglomerate. It is one of the two private free-to-air channels in Portugal, among the seven terrestrial free-to-air channels broadcasting from the country. It too, is the most-watched channel in Portugal from 1995 to 2005, and again from 2019 to today.

Other channels operated by SIC carried on satellite and cable TV in Portugal are:
SIC Notícias, news channel;
SIC Radical, general entertainment channel targeting a younger audience;
SIC Mulher, general entertainment channel targeting a female audience;
SIC K, general entertainment channel targeting kids;
SIC Internacional, an international channel which broadcasts in Europe, Africa, South America, North America, and Australia;
SIC Caras, an entertainment channel primarily focused on celebrities.

History

The company was first registered in 1987, with Granada Television initially holding a 20% interest, with the rest being owned by Impala, Expresso and Projornal. Brazilian television channel Rede Globo later took over Granada's interest after the latter left the company.

The channel initially (until January 2019) broadcast from converted studios in Carnaxide. In 1992, SIC was owned by a consortium led by Francisco Pinto Balsemão, backed by Controljornal, TSF, Rádio Comercial, Lusomundo, Expresso, Impala Editores and Globo.

On October 1, 1992 (mere days after starting its signal at least in Lisbon), SIC held its first experimental broadcast. During a five day period, the channel broadcast an international soccer match, a rock concert, two made-for-TV movies and a debate about Maastricht at Associação Comercial de Lisboa.

Regular transmissions began on 6 October 1992, becoming the first Portuguese private television channel.

In its initial years, it acquired a large audience, eventually overtaking RTP1 by 1995. SIC became widely known across Europe for achieving high viewing figures just two to three years after launching, as well as being the subject of an Arte documentary known as Cette Télévision est la Vôtre (This Television is Yours), directed by Mariana Otero.

In 2005, TVI, after recovering from a financial crisis, overtook SIC in the ratings. Aside from RTP1 taking over second place in 2007, 2009 and 2010, for the next fourteen years, SIC would be in second place until overtaking TVI in 2019.

In 2011, Impresa opened SIC's new Porto studios in Matosinhos, on the site of a former slaughterhouse. The studios also holds the newsrooms of Expresso, Visão, the Caras magazine, the web portal AEIOU.pt and Infoportugal. In 2019, SIC, along with its parent company Impresa, relocated from its studios in Carnaxide to a new building in Paço de Arcos.

Programming
Nowadays, SIC has a programming largely based on talk shows, Brazilian soap operas produced by Globo, Portuguese soaps, game shows and sketch shows. Like the other major broadcaster, TVI, SIC airs international TV series such as Criminal Minds, the various CSI series and Entourage always after 1 a.m. SIC also relies largely on Globo productions, due to an exclusivity contract which obligates SIC to broadcast every soap opera produced. In-house productions include occasional reality shows and comedy sketch shows, which include Malucos do Riso, a long-running series with focus on dramatized jokes, and Gato Fedorento.

Table

Shows
Casa Feliz  (Happy House)
Júlia
Episódio Especial (Special Episode)
Fama Show (Fame Show)

Family entertainment
Peso Pesado (The Biggest Loser)
Factor X (X Factor)
Ídolos (Idol)
Ponto de Encontro
Cantor ou Impostor? (I Can See Your Voice)

Soap operas

Laços de Sangue (Blood Ties)
Rosa Fogo (Fire of Rose)
Dancin' Days (Dancin' Days)
Poderosas (Powerful)
Coração d'Ouro (Golden Heart)
Rainha das Flores (Queen of Flowers)

Sports
 UEFA Europa League
 Red Bull Air Race World Championship

TV series

CSI: Crime Scene Investigation (CSI: Las Vegas)
CSI: Miami
CSI: NY (CSI: Nova Iorque)
Criminal Minds (Mentes Criminosas)
Downton Abbey
NCIS (Investigação Criminal)
NCIS: Los Angeles (Investigação Criminal Los Angeles)
In Treatment
The Walking Dead (Os Mortos Vivos)
Los Protegidos (Os Protegidos)
CSI: Cyber
Blacklist
Agents of S.H.I.E.L.D (Agentes S.H.I.E.L.D)

News
Edição da Manhã (Morning Edition)
Primeiro Jornal (1:00 pm News)
Jornal da Noite (Evening News)

SIC Kids

Oggy and the Cockroaches (Oggy e as Baratas)
Teenage Mutant Ninja Turtles
W.I.T.C.H.
Popeye The Sailor
Dexter's Laboratory
Gravion
Looney Tunes
 Pinkalicious & Peterrific (La Rose de Curioso La) (upcoming July 22, 2022)
The Magic School Bus
Recess - Disney Kids
House of Mouse - Disney Kids
Kim Possible - Disney Kids
Lilo and Stitch - Disney Kids
Brandy and Mr. Whiskers - Disney Kids
Timon & Pumbaa - Disney KidsThe Emperor's New School - Disney KidsThe Replacements - Disney KidsPhineas and Ferb - Disney KidsTeamo Supremo - Disney KidsFish Hooks - Disney KidsDuckTales - Disney KidsUltimate Spider-Man - Disney KidsThe Suite Life on Deck - Disney KidsThe Wizards of Waverly Place - Disney KidsSonny with a Chance - Disney KidsShake It Up - Disney KidsJessie - Disney KidsDoug - Disney KidsAction ManAnimaniacsBratzPokémonDigimon (aired only 4 seasons)Sailor MoonDragon BallDragon Ball ZDragon Ball GTDragon Ball SuperSuper PigYAT Anshin! Luxury Space ToursFlint the Time DetectiveSigma 6Shin-Chan (Vitello and Phuuz dubs)MirmoYu-Gi-Oh!Monster RancherMon Colle KnightsShinzoMegaMan NT Warrior Ōban Star-RacersPuccaMonster WarriorsNaruto - SIC and SIC KYin Yang Yo!Inspector Gadget - SIC and SIC KBen 10 - SIC and SIC KBen 10: Alien Force - SIC and SIC KGormiti - SIC KIron Man: Armored Adventures - SIC KMr. Bean (animated TV series) - SIC KAngel's Friends - SIC KMadison Online - SIC KBleach - SIC KYu-Gi-Oh! GX - SIC KHorseland - SIC KZorro: Generation Z - SIC KLegend Of The Dragon - SIC KMichaelais Wild Challenge - SIC KI.N.K Invisible Network Kids - SIC KPuppy in My Pocket - SIC and SIC KPower Rangers (1994–present)Violetta(2015–2016)SpongeBob SquarePants (only aired 2 seasons)
ChalkZone  (only aired 3 seasons)
In 2006, started to broadcast the block "SIC Kids", broadcasting a few hours later the block "Disney Kids" (the featured, and still features, only Disney programming).

Live showsGlobos de Ouro (Golden Globes)Parabéns, SIC'' ("Happy Birthday, SIC", literally "Congratulations"—airs when it's SIC's birthday)

Movies

Exclusive broadcasting rights
 Walt Disney Pictures/Touchstone Pictures
 Metro-Goldwyn-Mayer/United Artists
 Lions Gate Entertainment/Summit Entertainment

Co-shared broadcasting rights
 Warner Bros./New Line Cinema (rights co-shared with RTP)
 Columbia Pictures/TriStar Pictures (rights co-shared with RTP)
 20th Century Fox/Regency Enterprises (rights co-shared with RTP and TVI)
 Universal Studios/Focus Features (rights co-shared with RTP and TVI)
 Paramount Pictures/DreamWorks Pictures (rights co-shared with TVI)

References

External links
Official site 
Behind the scenes of SIC's first day on air
Impresa
TSF Rádio Notícias
Rádio Cidade (Amadora)
Theme song, using Globo's IDs from the 80s and early 90s, used at the start and end of broadcasts

 
1992 establishments in Portugal
Impresa
Portuguese-language television networks
Television networks in Portugal
Television stations in Portugal
Television channels and stations established in 1992